Adela Ana María del Rosario Camacho Sinibaldi de Torrebiarte (30 March 1949 – 16 December 2020) was a Guatemalan politician.

Career
She served as the president of the National Football Federation of Guatemala (FENAFUTG) from 2016 to 2017. She was also a candidate in the 2011 presidential election.

She had two children, Luis Pedro and Maria Inés. She is survived by her grandchildren, Santiago, Andres, Alejandro, Isabel, Gabriel, Lucia, and Marcelo. Her funeral took place on 16 December 2020.

She was a founding member of the Suffering Mothers which is a support group for her country's kidnap victims. When she was Interior Minister in 2007 she reacted to the killing of three politicians from Salvador and the execution of four police who were the prime suspects. She announced that over 550 policemen who were known for misconduct were to be sacked. 

Adela de Torrebiarte died of lung cancer on 16 December 2020.

References

1949 births
2020 deaths
People from Guatemala City
Government ministers of Guatemala
Crecer politicians
Universidad de San Carlos de Guatemala alumni
21st-century Guatemalan women politicians
21st-century Guatemalan politicians
Women government ministers of Guatemala
Deaths from lung cancer
Deaths from cancer in Guatemala